Acanthoneta is a genus of sheet weavers first described by Eskov & Marusik in 1992. , it contains only three species, found in China, Russia, and North America

References

Linyphiidae
Araneomorphae genera
Spiders of China
Spiders of North America
Spiders of Russia